Christopher Edward Perkins (born 21 September 1891 at Peterborough, Cambridgeshire, died Ipswich, Suffolk, 8 April 1968) was a British artist who worked in England and New Zealand.

Background and education

Perkins was the son of John Edward Sharman Perkins and his wife, Margaret Charlotte . His older brother was Frank Perkins. Their father  was an agricultural engineer who became managing director of Barford & Perkins.

He was educated at Gresham's School, Holt, then at the Heatherley School of Art in London, in 1907, an academy in Rome in 1908, and the Slade School of Fine Art, where his fellow students included Dora Carrington, Mark Gertler, Stanley Spencer and C. R. W. Nevinson.

Career
By 1914 he launched his professional career, but joined the British army at the outbreak of the First World War, rising to the rank of acting captain. He then returned to painting, and in the 1920s he and his family lived in France. He published an essay, On Museums, in 1925. His work was becoming known, and in 1925 he was helped by Roger Fry and William Rothenstein for a teaching position. He held a major exhibition in London in 1927. In January 1929 he went to teach at the Wellington Technical College in New Zealand. In 1932 he let his contract lapse and moved to Rotorua, where the availability of Māori subjects was an attraction.

Perkins exhibited regularly with the New Zealand Academy of Fine Arts from 1929 to 1933. He held a solo exhibition in 1931. In 1933 he held a substantial exhibition in Sydney, Australia.

Important works include Silverstream brickworks (1930), Taranaki (1931), Activity on the wharf (1931), Meditation (1931), Haka, Maori meeting (1932–34).

Perkins returned to England in February 1934. He served in the army again during the Second World War and also worked as an unofficial war artist. He achieved a reputation as a portrait painter, showing pictures at the Royal Academy of Arts and holding many exhibitions, but never attained the leading position he had had in New Zealand.

Family
Perkins was married on 1 April 1914, to Agnes Berry Shaw. They had three children; Jane Perkins married the mycologist Denis Garrett and published a memoir in 1986, An Artist's Daughter, recounting the family's time in New Zealand.

Publications
On Museums by Christopher Perkins (St Tropez, 1925)

References

The art of Christopher Perkins by P.W. Robertson, in Art in New Zealand 4, No 13 (September 1931): 8-40
The story of Christopher Perkins in Art in Australia 3, No 48 (February 1933): 31-37
An introduction to New Zealand painting 1839-1980 by G. H. Brown & H. Keith (Auckland, 1980)
An Artist's Daughter: with Christopher Perkins in New Zealand, 1929–1934 by Jane Garrett (Shoal Bay Press, Auckland, 1986) 
Biography of Christopher Edward Perkins at Dictionary of New Zealand Biography

External links
Works in the collection of the Museum of New Zealand Te Papa Tongarewa

1891 births
1968 deaths
20th-century English painters
English male painters
New Zealand painters
People educated at Gresham's School
Alumni of the Slade School of Fine Art
People from Peterborough
British Army personnel of World War I
British Army officers
20th-century English male artists